Branislav Pindroch (born 30 October 1991) is a Slovak professional footballer who plays as a goalkeeper for Resovia.

Club career
He was offered new contract by Notts County at the end of the 2017–18 season. He was released from his contract by Notts County in January 2019.

After his return from the United Kingdom, he had played for top division Slovak clubs Nitra and ViOn Zlaté Moravce.

Honours

Club
Raków Częstochowa
Polish Cup: 2020–21

Career statistics

References

External links
FK Dukla Banská Bystrica profile 

1991 births
Living people
Slovak footballers
FK Dukla Banská Bystrica players
MFK Karviná players
Notts County F.C. players
FC Nitra players
FC ViOn Zlaté Moravce players
Raków Częstochowa players
Resovia (football) players
Association football goalkeepers
Expatriate footballers in the Czech Republic
Expatriate footballers in England
Expatriate footballers in Poland
Slovak Super Liga players
Ekstraklasa players
I liga players
Sportspeople from Banská Bystrica